USNS Antioch (T-AG-180) was the United States Navy name assigned to the United States Merchant Marine Victory Ship SS Alfred Victory. She was built in 1945 and had a tonnage of 7,607 GRT.

World War II
During World war II the Alfred Victory was operated by the Hammond Shipping Company under charter with the Maritime Commission and War Shipping Administration.  On February 14, 1946, Alfred Victory was off Beachy Head in the English Channel when she was involved in a collision with a British coastal collier, the 1,552 GRT SS Fulham VII, which then sank.
In 1947 the Alfred Victory was placed in the James River, Reserve Fleet.

Vietnam War
In 1965 she was removed from the Reserve fleet and activated for the Vietnam War as the USNS Antioch.  Alfred Victory was one of 12 ships scheduled to be acquired by the United States Navy in February 1966 and converted into Forward Depot Ships for the Military Sea Transport Service. Alfred Victory (MCV-745) was chosen for this conversion and assigned the name USNS Antioch (T-AG-180), but the program was cancelled and the ships were not acquired by the Navy.  From 1 July 1984, Alfred Victory was laid up in Suisun Bay, California, as part of the National Defense Reserve Fleet. In 1988 she was scrapped at Kaohsiung.

References
 

Victory ships
Ships built in Richmond, California
1945 ships
Maritime incidents in 1946
World War II merchant ships of the United States
Cancelled ships of the United States Navy
Troop ships of the United States